Håvard Storbæk (born 5 May 1986) is a Norwegian football midfielder who plays for Storms BK.

He announced at the end of 2019, that he was retiring from professional football. He has previously played for Nybergsund, FK Haugesund and Odd. He is the second cousin of Jarl-André Storbæk.

Career
Storbæk was born in Elverum and grew up in Ljørdalen in Trysil, near the Swedish border, and played football for Østre Trysil and Trysil before he joined Nybergsund IL-Trysil, where he played for five seasons. In his first season for Nybergsund IL-Trysil he played 25 matches and scored 16 goals.

In his second season for Nybergsund IL, Storbæk played 25 matches and scored 7 goals in the First Division. Odd Grenland's head coach Dag-Eilev Fagermo wanted to sign Storbæk after his performance in the match between Nybergsund and Odd Grenland on 29 June 2008, where Storbæk scored a goal. Storbæk rejected offers from HamKam and Strømsgodset and signed a two-year contract with Odd Grenland on 14 July 2008, and joined the club who had won promotion to Tippeligaen after the season.

Storbæk's first match for Odd Grenland was a friendly match against Lyn on 23 January 2009 that ended in a 1–1 draw, he was in the starting line-up but was substituted after 73 minutes for Magnus Lekven. Storbæk made his debut in Tippeligaen in Odd Grenland's first match of the 2009 season, he came on as a substitute for Simen Brenne after 87 minutes when Odd lost 3–0 against Viking. In the team's first home game of the season, Storbæk scored the 2–0 goal against Sandefjord.

Storbæk did not want to sign a new contract with Odd Grenland, and could leave the club after the 2011-season as a free agent. In October 2011, FK Haugesund announced that they had signed a three-year contract with Storbæk starting from January 2012.

On 20 March 2020 it was confirmed, that Samuelsen had joined Storms BK together with his former Odd-teammate Jone Samuelsen.

Career statistics

Club

References

External links
Oddrane.no profile
oddgrenland.no profile

1986 births
Living people
People from Trysil
Norway youth international footballers
Norwegian footballers
Nybergsund IL players
Odds BK players
FK Haugesund players
Sandefjord Fotball players
Norwegian First Division players
Eliteserien players
Association football midfielders
Sportspeople from Innlandet